The following is a list of Michigan State Historic Sites in Allegan County, Michigan. Sites marked with a dagger (†) are also listed on the National Register of Historic Places in Allegan County, Michigan.


Current listings

See also
 National Register of Historic Places listings in Allegan County, Michigan

Sources
 Historic Sites Online – Allegan County. Michigan State Housing Developmental Authority. Accessed January 23, 2011.

References

Allegan County
State Historic Sites
Tourist attractions in Allegan County, Michigan